Cyrus Amouzgar (1934 – 2 November 2021) was an Iranian journalist, author, and politician. He served as acting Minister of Information and Tourism, which oversaw the national radio and television broadcaster, and press outlets, from late 1978 to February 11, 1979, in the cabinet of Prime Minister Shapour Bakhtiar.

References

1934 births
2021 deaths
National Front (Iran) politicians
People from Babol
Iranian male writers